WBRH (90.3 FM) is a student-run jazz high school radio station in Baton Rouge, Louisiana. The station, at Baton Rouge Magnet High School, broadcasts with an effective radiated power (ERP) of 21 kW. It is owned by the East Baton Rouge Parish School Board, along with sister station KBRH (1260 AM). WBRH and KBRH are the only high school radio stations in the country operating 24 hours per day year-round.

History
It currently plays smooth jazz until 5PM for mainstream jazz on weekdays with rhythm and blues shows on Saturdays, and classic jazz shows on Sundays including big bands, swing, and standards in the morning.

Audio Platform

www.WBRH.org.

Baton Rouge Magnet High School.
www.WBRH.org

See also
 List of jazz radio stations in the United States

References

External links
 Classic Jazz & Smooth Jazz, 90.3FM

Radio stations in Louisiana
High school radio stations in the United States
Radio stations established in 1977
Jazz radio stations in the United States
NPR member stations
Jazz in Louisiana
1977 establishments in Louisiana